Evat (also Romanized as Evāt; also known as Avbāt, Owbār, and Ūbāt) is a village in Valupey Rural District, in the Central District of Savadkuh County, Mazandaran Province, Iran. At the 2006 census, its population was 105, in 36 families.

References 

Populated places in Savadkuh County